The Stonehenge Archer is the name given to a Bronze Age man whose body was discovered in the outer ditch of Stonehenge.  Unlike most burials in the Stonehenge Landscape, his body was not in a barrow, although it did appear to have been deliberately and carefully buried in the ditch.

Examination of the skeleton indicated that the man was local to the area and aged about 30 when he died.  Radiocarbon dating suggests that he died around 2300 BCE, making his death roughly contemporary with the Amesbury Archer and the Boscombe Bowmen buried 3 miles away in Amesbury.

He came to be known as an archer because of the stone wrist-guard and a number of flint arrowheads buried with him.  In fact, several of the arrowheads' tips were located in the skeleton's bones, suggesting that the man had been killed by them.

His body was excavated in 1978 by Richard Atkinson and John G. Evans who had been re-examining an older trench in the ditch and bank of Stonehenge.  His remains are now housed in the Salisbury Museum in Salisbury.

See also
Boscombe Bowmen
Amesbury Archer

References

Bibliography
 Chippendale, C, Stonehenge Complete (Thames and Hudson, London, 2004) 
 English Heritage Guidebooks: "Stonehenge" (English Heritage 2005)

External links
 Salisbury Museum page on the archer
 Encyclopædia Britannica short video documentary (takes a short time to load)
 Details and a theory about the Stonehenge Archer

Bronze Age England
History of Wiltshire
Indo-European archaeological sites
Stonehenge